Galina Borisovna Zlotnikova (Галина Борисовна Злотникова, born 1984) was a Russian female water polo player.

She was a member of the Russia women's national water polo team, playing as a goalkeeper. She was a part of the  team at the 2004 Summer Olympics. On club level she played for Kinef Kirishi in Russia.

See also
 Russia women's Olympic water polo team records and statistics
 List of women's Olympic water polo tournament goalkeepers
 List of World Aquatics Championships medalists in water polo

References

External links
 

1984 births
Living people
Sportspeople from Nizhny Novgorod
Russian female water polo players
Water polo goalkeepers
Olympic water polo players of Russia
Water polo players at the 2004 Summer Olympics
21st-century Russian women